Chaahat – Ek Nasha is a 2005 Indian Bollywood film directed by Jai Prakash. It premiered on 11 February 2005.  The film stars Manisha Koirala, Sharad Kapoor, Aryan Vaid and Preeti Jhangiani.

Plot
Mallika Arora, a pop star, who falls in love with Rahul Kapoor, the owner of RK Music World. He thinks of her as his best friend only. Though she is physically attracted to Rahul, she does not want to tie the knot. Rahul and Mallika have had physical relations. However, when he proposes to her, she politely turns him down, saying that she does not believe in wedlock. She is strongly of the view that the instant a couple gets married, love and attraction slip away.

The story takes a new turn with the downfall of Mallika as all of her albums are flopping and she is becoming a fading star. Rahul launches a newcomer, Rashmi Jaitly in his new music video. Rashmi's debut music video is a big hit and she becomes a star overnight. Rahul falls in love with her and Rashmi reciprocates his feelings. Rahul decides to marry her.

When this reality of Rahul's falling in love with Rashmi dawns upon Mallika, she is shattered. She gets drunk and orders her personal bodyguard Jaidev to kill Rahul. However, the next morning, when her alcoholic intoxication vanishes, Mallika realizes her mistake and calls up Jaidev in order to stop him from killing Rahul.

But Jaidev, who is in one-sided love with Mallika, is all set to eliminate Rahul. A dangerous game has begun, in which Mallika wants to save her love at any cost.

Cast
Manisha Koirala as Mallika Arora
Sharad Kapoor as Jaidev
Aryan Vaid as Rahul Kapoor
Preeti Jhangiani as Rashmi Jaitly
Govind Namdev as Dr.Sanjeev Jaitley
Sayaji Shinde as Manmohan Rangeela

Music

The soundtrack of the film contains six songs composed by Anand Raj Anand.

References

External links

2005 films
2000s Hindi-language films
Films scored by Anand Raj Anand